In enzymology, a methanol dehydrogenase is an enzyme that catalyzes the chemical reaction:

methanol  formaldehyde + 2 electrons + 2H+

How the electrons are captured and transported depends upon the kind of methanol dehydrogenase. There are three main types of MDHs: NAD+-dependent MDH, pyrrolo-quinoline quinone dependent MDH, and oxygen-dependent alcohol oxidase. A common electron acceptor in biological systems is nicotinamide adenine dinucleotide (NAD+) and some enzymes use a related molecule called nicotinamide adenine dinucleotide phosphate (NADP+). An NAD+-dependent methanol dehydrogenase() was first reported in a Gram-positive methylotroph and is an enzyme that catalyzes the chemical reaction

methanol + NAD+  formaldehyde + NADH + H+

Thus, the two substrates of this enzyme are methanol and NAD+, whereas its 3 products are formaldehyde, NADH, and H+.

This enzyme belongs to the family of oxidoreductases, specifically those acting on the CH-OH group of donor with NAD+ or NADP+ as acceptor. The systematic name of this enzyme class is methanol:NAD+ oxidoreductase. This enzyme participates in methane metabolism.

Prior to the discovery of this enzyme, methanol oxidation in Gram-negative bacteria had been shown to be by way of an (NAD+) independent alcohol dehydrogenase found originally in Pseudomonas M27. This enzyme (EC. 1.1.99.8) contains a prosthetic group called Pyrrolo Quinoline Quinone (PQQ) that accepts the electrons generated from methanol oxidation and passes these electrons to cytochrome c.

References

Further reading 

 

EC 1.1.1
NADH-dependent enzymes
Enzymes of unknown structure
Dehydrogenase